L.E. Desmarais et Cie, known in English as L.E. Desmarais & Company, was a photo studio active in Montreal, Quebec during the 19th century. The company was run by Louis-Élie and Ovila Desmarais.
From 1864 to 1868, the company operated a studio at 277 rue Mignonne, at the corner of boulevard Saint Laurent.
 
Photographs by the Desmarais' are included in the collection of the Musée national des beaux-arts du Québec.

References

Companies based in Montreal